= Campaign to Keep Guns Off Campus =

US gun control advocacy organization

The Campaign to Keep Guns Off Campus
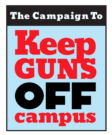
- Formation: 2007
- Headquarters: Croton Falls
- Executive Director: Andy Pelosi
- Website: keepgunsoffcampus.org

The Campaign to Keep Guns Off Campus is a 501(c)(3) non-profit gun control advocacy organization in the United States. The Campaign has chapters in several states, and works with colleges and universities across the country to oppose legislative policies that would force loaded, concealed guns on campuses. Around 400 colleges and universities around the country have joined the coalition to keep guns off campus and stop campus carry bills. Since 2008, they have helped stop campus carry legislation in 18 states. Currently, 18 states and Washington, D.C., effectively prohibit guns on campus. In the remaining states, colleges set their own policy on guns, and most schools do not allow firearms on campus.
